The Connecticut Academy of Arts and Sciences is a learned society founded in 1799 in New Haven, Connecticut "to cultivate every art and science which may tend to advance the interest and happiness of a free and virtuous people." Its purpose is the dissemination of scholarly information.

In the 2021–2022 academic year, the CAAS had 250 members.

Publications 
Transactions of the Connecticut Academy of Arts and Sciences
Memoirs of the Connecticut Academy of Arts and Sciences
Catalogue of publications

Notable members 
Asger Aaboe, historian and mathematician
Hezekiah Augur, sculptor and inventor
Simeon Eben Baldwin, jurist, law professor and governor
Charles Emerson Beecher, paleontologist
Bertram Boltwood, radiochemist
Sheila Levrant de Bretteville, graphic designer, artist and educator
William Henry Brewer, botanist
George Jarvis Brush, mineralogist and academic administrator
Henry A. Bumstead, electromagnetist
Russell Henry Chittenden, biochemist
Edward Salisbury Dana, mineralogist and physicist
Arnold Dashefsky, sociologist
Franklin Bowditch Dexter, librarian and university administrator
Timothy Dwight
Edson Fessenden Gallaudet, aviator
Josiah Willard Gibbs, physicist, chemist, and mathematician
Frank Austin Gooch, chemist and engineer
Henry Solon Graves, forester and educator
Charles Sheldon Hastings, physicist
Yandell Henderson, physiologist
James Mason Hoppin, educator and writer
George Trumbull Ladd, philosopher, educator, and psychologist
Joseph LaPalombara, political scientist
Charles Lemert, sociologist
Linda Lorimer, university administrator
Chester Lyman, president 
George Grant MacCurdy, anthropologist
Lafayette Mendel, nutritionist
Hubert Anson Newton, astronomer and mathematician
Alexander Petrunkevitch, arachnologist
Charles Brinckerhoff Richards, engineer
William North Rice, geologist, educator, Methodist theologian
John Rose, organist
Edward Elbridge Salisbury, Sanskritist
Benjamin Silliman, chemist and geologist
Joseph Siry, architectural historian
Gaddis Smith
Percey F. Smith, mathematician
Jennifer Tucker, historian and biologist
Addison Van Name, librarian and linguist
John Monroe Van Vleck, mathematician and astronomer
Addison Emery Verrill, president
Noah Webster, lexicographer, author, editor, prolific author
Eli Whitney
William Kurtz Wimsatt, Jr., literary theorist and critic

Sources 
Rollin Gustav Osterweis, The Sesquicentennial History of the Connecticut Academy of Arts and Sciences (New Haven, 1949)
Mary Ellen Ellsworth, A History of the Connecticut Academy of Arts and Sciences 1799-1999 (Transactions, vol. 55)

External links 
 
 Yale University entry
Scholarly Societies entry

Learned societies of the United States
Organizations established in 1799
Education in New Haven, Connecticut
Culture of Yale University
Organizations based in New Haven, Connecticut
1799 establishments in the United States